Alexander Melville may refer to:

Alexander Melville, 5th Earl of Leven (1695–1754), Scottish peer
Alexander Melville (anatomist) (1819–1901), Irish anatomist

Alexander Melville, Lord Raith (1655–1698), Scottish treasurer-depute
Alexander Melville (artist) (1823–1892), British portrait painter

See also
Alexander Leslie-Melville (disambiguation), later Earls of Leven